The Emfietzoglou Gallery Museum is an art gallery in Athens, Greece. It is sited in Marousi near the Athens Metro station. Its founder Prodromos Emfietzoglou gave his private art collection of over 500 works to the public.

These days the Emphietsoglou gallery offers a review of 750 works of modern Greek art including some of the best paintings from the last 200 years.



History
Since 19th century Prodromos Emfietzoglou and his family due to their interest in Greek art were collecting works of various Greek painters. Their passion in combination with many artists' donations led in 1999 to the foundation of the museum. Today the collection is composed of paintings, sculpture, photography, engravings and video installations.

The Gallery
The museum is cited in Maroussi in 3.000 m2 area next to the collector's residence. 
Today there are about 750 works of 260 Greek artists. The works are distributed in the museum's building, in the surrounding open area and some are exposed in the collector's residence but in spite of this spatial division visitors are allowed to visit all the works.
The last years several educational happenings are arranged. It is calculated that about 20.000 students took part in these happenings.

Collection

The collection of the Gallery includes major artworks by notable Greek artists such as:

Nicholaos Gysis
Georgios Jakobides
Nikiphoros Lytras
Konstantinos Parthenis
Yiannis Moralis
Yiannis Gaitis
Takis
Vaso Katraki

Visitor information
Location: Foinikon Str., Anavryta, Maroussi, Athens 151 26, Greece, Athens, Greece
Tel.: 0030-210-8097100
Opening hours: Sun 10 am - 6 pm - Educational programms:Teu-Wed 9.45 am, 11.30 am.

See also
Art in Modern Greece
Greek art

References
Works of Emfietzoglou collection (only Greek)
Greek article-photo of the Museum
Article about the collection (only Greek)

Museums in Athens
Greek art
Art museums established in 1999
Art museums and galleries in Greece
1999 establishments in Greece